Brimbank Park is a metropolitan regional park managed by Parks Victoria situated in the north-western Melbourne suburb of Keilor East, Victoria, Australia.

History
About 40,000 years ago: first signs of possible human habitation along the Maribyrnong River. The Keilor Cranium and femur of an aboriginal person, found in 1940 in a sand bank, has been carbon dated at about 12,000 years. The area is home to the Wurundjeri people of the Kulin nation.

In the late 1830s, Europeans first settled the area and used the fertile river valley as stock runs. They often drove stock around the brim of the bank, thus the park's name, Brimbank.  The river flats on the east bank were used for market gardening until 1983.

In 1976, Brimbank Park opened to the public as part of the Maribyrnong Valley Park, combined with the adjacent Horseshoe Bend Children's farm and Greenvale Reservoir Park. The Maribyrnong River has hollowed out a valley some 55 metres below the Keilor Plain, with a steep bank on the northern side and gentle terraces on the southern side.

In 2016, the park was implemented a Victorian-first pilot project to help children on the autism spectrum play more freely, with Parks Victoria creating a digital "script" showing items and sights they would encounter at the park. This was designed to alleviate anxiety, particularly when moving from one place to another, and was designed alongside autism advocacy organisation Amaze.

In 2021, Parks Victoria began helping plant trees at the park as part of the "More Trees for a Cooler, Greener West" project which aims to plant trees in urban areas of Melbourne's western suburbs with the lowest tree canopy covers. This was done to help increase urban shade cover with phase two commencing in 2022 and stage three to be completed by the mid-2023.

Features
The park fields recreational activities with facilities including walking and cycling tracks, playgrounds, picnic areas, amenities and a café. The park is located along Old Calder Highway with an entrance off Keilor Park Drive.

The Maribyrnong River flows through the park, which holds as one end of the 25km Maribyrnong River Trail. At Keilor, the river winds back on itself in a horseshoe bend, before winding south again at Brimbank Park. Brimbank Park is home to wildlife including swamp wallabies, blue tongued lizards and echidnas. Birds including parrots, herons, galahs, blue wrens, yellow-tailed thornbills, rosellas, flame robins and the peregrine falcon can also be seen in the park.

References

External links
- Brimbank Park

Parks in Melbourne
City of Brimbank